This is a list of species in genus Coelioxys, the leaf-cutting cuckoo bees or sharp-tailed bees.

, ITIS lists 500 species in this genus.


A B C D E F G H I J K L M N O P Q R S T U V U W X Y Z

A
Coelioxys abdominalis
Coelioxys aberrans
Coelioxys abnormis
Coelioxys acanthopyga
Coelioxys acanthura
Coelioxys aculeata
Coelioxys aculeaticeps
Coelioxys acutivalva
Coelioxys adani
Coelioxys afra
Coelioxys agilis
Coelioxys alacris
Coelioxys alata
Coelioxys alatiformis
Coelioxys alayoi
Coelioxys albifrons
Coelioxys albiventris
Coelioxys albociliata
Coelioxys albofasciata
Coelioxys albolineata
Coelioxys albomarginata
Coelioxys albonotata
Coelioxys alfkeni
Coelioxys alisal
Coelioxys alternata
Coelioxys amazonica
Coelioxys ambrosettii
Coelioxys analis
Coelioxys angelica
Coelioxys angulata
Coelioxys angustivalva
Coelioxys anisitsi
Coelioxys annamensis
Coelioxys apacheorum
Coelioxys aperta
Coelioxys apicata
Coelioxys argentea
Coelioxys argentipes
Coelioxys artemis
Coelioxys asclepiadis
Coelioxys aspaste
Coelioxys ateneata
Coelioxys aureociliata
Coelioxys aurifrons
Coelioxys auripes
Coelioxys aurolimbata
Coelioxys aurulenta
Coelioxys australis
Coelioxys azteca

B
Coelioxys bakeri
Coelioxys balasto
Coelioxys banksi
Coelioxys barbata
Coelioxys barkeri
Coelioxys bequaertiana
Coelioxys beroni
Coelioxys bertonii
Coelioxys bicingulata
Coelioxys bifida
Coelioxys bifoleata
Coelioxys bifoliata
Coelioxys bifoveolata
Coelioxys binghami
Coelioxys bipustulata
Coelioxys biroi
Coelioxys bisoncornua
Coelioxys blabera
Coelioxys boharti
Coelioxys bonaerensis
Coelioxys bonplandiana
Coelioxys brachypyga
Coelioxys brasiliensis
Coelioxys braunsiana
Coelioxys brevicaudata
Coelioxys brevis
Coelioxys breviventris
Coelioxys bruchi
Coelioxys bruneipes
Coelioxys bruneri
Coelioxys bucephala
Coelioxys buchwaldi
Coelioxys buehleri
Coelioxys bulbosa
Coelioxys bullaticeps
Coelioxys burgdorfi

C
Coelioxys caeruleipennis
Coelioxys caffra
Coelioxys calabarensis
Coelioxys cameghinoi
Coelioxys capensis
Coelioxys capitata
Coelioxys carinicauda
Coelioxys carinulata
Coelioxys castanea
Coelioxys caudata
Coelioxys cavigena
Coelioxys cayennensis
Coelioxys cearensis
Coelioxys cerasiopleura
Coelioxys chacoensis
Coelioxys cherenensis
Coelioxys chichimeca
Coelioxys chilensis
Coelioxys chionospila
Coelioxys chola
Coelioxys circumscripta
Coelioxys circumscriptus
Coelioxys cisnerosi
Coelioxys clypearis
Coelioxys clypeata
Coelioxys cochleariformis
Coelioxys coeruleipennis
Coelioxys coloboptyche
Coelioxys coloratula
Coelioxys columbica
Coelioxys concavogenalis
Coelioxys concolor
Coelioxys confusa
Coelioxys congoensis
Coelioxys conoidea
Coelioxys conspersa
Coelioxys cordillerana
Coelioxys corduvensis
Coelioxys coriacea
Coelioxys correntina
Coelioxys costaricensis
Coelioxys cothura
Coelioxys coturnix
Coelioxys crassiceps
Coelioxys crassiventris
Coelioxys cuneata
Coelioxys cyanura

D
Coelioxys dapitanensis
Coelioxys darwiniensis
Coelioxys deani
Coelioxys decipiens
Coelioxys deletangi
Coelioxys demeter
Coelioxys dentigera
Coelioxys desmieri
Coelioxys difformis
Coelioxys digitata
Coelioxys dinellii
Coelioxys dispersa
Coelioxys diversidentata
Coelioxys dobzhanskyi
Coelioxys doelloi
Coelioxys doeringi
Coelioxys dolichos
Coelioxys domestica
Coelioxys ducalis
Coelioxys duckei

E
Coelioxys echinata
Coelioxys edentata
Coelioxys edita
Coelioxys eduardi
Coelioxys elata
Coelioxys elegantula
Coelioxys elizabeth
Coelioxys elongata
Coelioxys elongativentris
Coelioxys elsei
Coelioxys emarginata
Coelioxys emarginatella
Coelioxys epaenete
Coelioxys epistene
Coelioxys erysimi
Coelioxys erythrura
Coelioxys excisa
Coelioxys eximia
Coelioxys exspectata

F
Coelioxys farinosa
Coelioxys fenestrata
Coelioxys fimbriata
Coelioxys florea
Coelioxys floridana
Coelioxys foersteri
Coelioxys fontanae
Coelioxys formosicola
Coelioxys fossulata
Coelioxys foveolata
Coelioxys foxii
Coelioxys frieseana
Coelioxys frigens
Coelioxys froggatti
Coelioxys fulviceps
Coelioxys fulvifrons
Coelioxys funeraria
Coelioxys fuscipennis

G
Coelioxys galactiae
Coelioxys gallardoi
Coelioxys genalis
Coelioxys genalis
Coelioxys genisei
Coelioxys genoconcavitus
Coelioxys germana
Coelioxys giacomellii
Coelioxys gigantea
Coelioxys gilensis
Coelioxys gonaspis
Coelioxys gracillima
Coelioxys grindeliae
Coelioxys guaranitica
Coelioxys guptai

H
Coelioxys haematura
Coelioxys haemorrhoa
Coelioxys heterozona
Coelioxys hickeni
Coelioxys hiroba
Coelioxys hirsutissima
Coelioxys hirtiventris
Coelioxys holmbergi
Coelioxys hosoba
Coelioxys huarpum
Coelioxys hubrichiana
Coelioxys humahuakae
Coelioxys hunteri
Coelioxys hyalinipennis

I
Coelioxys ignava
Coelioxys immaculata
Coelioxys incarinata
Coelioxys inconspicua
Coelioxys indica
Coelioxys inermis
Coelioxys insita
Coelioxys insolita
Coelioxys intacta
Coelioxys integra
Coelioxys intermedia
Coelioxys iranica
Coelioxys issororensis

J
Coelioxys joergenseni
Coelioxys joergenseniana
Coelioxys jujuyensis
Coelioxys junodi

K
Coelioxys kasachstana
Coelioxys katangensis
Coelioxys khasiana
Coelioxys kosemponis
Coelioxys kualana
Coelioxys kuscheli

L
Coelioxys labiosa
Coelioxys laevicollis
Coelioxys laevigata
Coelioxys laevis
Coelioxys lanceolata
Coelioxys langi
Coelioxys lata
Coelioxys latefasciata
Coelioxys laticauda
Coelioxys laticeps
Coelioxys lativalva
Coelioxys lativentris
Coelioxys lativentroides
Coelioxys laudabilis
Coelioxys leopoldensis
Coelioxys leopoldinae
Coelioxys leptura
Coelioxys leucochrysea
Coelioxys liberalis
Coelioxys ljuba
Coelioxys longispina
Coelioxys longiventris
Coelioxys loricula
Coelioxys luangwana
Coelioxys lucidicauda
Coelioxys luzonica
Coelioxys lyprura

M
Coelioxys macaria
Coelioxys maculata
Coelioxys maculoides
Coelioxys madagascariensis
Coelioxys magretti
Coelioxys manchurica
Coelioxys mandibularis
Coelioxys manilae
Coelioxys mapuche
Coelioxys marchalli
Coelioxys marginata
Coelioxys melanopus
Coelioxys mendozina
Coelioxys menthae
Coelioxys mesae
Coelioxys mesopotamica
Coelioxys mexicana
Coelioxys mielbergi
Coelioxys mimetica
Coelioxys minuta
Coelioxys miranda
Coelioxys missionum
Coelioxys mitchelli
Coelioxys modesta
Coelioxys moesta
Coelioxys mongolica
Coelioxys mutans

N
Coelioxys nasuta
Coelioxys natalensis
Coelioxys neavei
Coelioxys neli
Coelioxys nigripes
Coelioxys nigrofimbriata
Coelioxys nigrura
Coelioxys nitidicauda
Coelioxys nitidicollis
Coelioxys nitidoscutellaris
Coelioxys nivosa
Coelioxys noa
Coelioxys nodis
Coelioxys novomexicana

O
Coelioxys oaxacana
Coelioxys obtusa
Coelioxys obtusata
Coelioxys obtusispina
Coelioxys obtusivalva
Coelioxys obtusiventris
Coelioxys occidentalis
Coelioxys octodentata
Coelioxys octodenticulata
Coelioxys odin
Coelioxys opacicollis
Coelioxys oriplanes
Coelioxys osmiae
Coelioxys otomita

P
Coelioxys pachyceps
Coelioxys pachyrhina
Coelioxys palmaris
Coelioxys paludicola
Coelioxys pampeana
Coelioxys paradoxa
Coelioxys paraguaya
Coelioxys paraguayensis
Coelioxys patagonica
Coelioxys patiens
Coelioxys patula
Coelioxys pauloensis
Coelioxys pedregalensis
Coelioxys penetatrix
Coelioxys peregrinata
Coelioxys pergandei
Coelioxys perseus
Coelioxys philippensis
Coelioxys picicornis
Coelioxys pieliana
Coelioxys piercei
Coelioxys piliclypeus
Coelioxys piligena
Coelioxys pilivalva
Coelioxys planidens
Coelioxys polycentris
Coelioxys pomona
Coelioxys popovi
Coelioxys porterae
Coelioxys postponenda
Coelioxys praetextata
Coelioxys pratti
Coelioxys producta
Coelioxys proxima
Coelioxys pruinosa
Coelioxys pruna
Coelioxys pucaraensis
Coelioxys pulchella
Coelioxys puncticollis
Coelioxys pygidialis

Q
Coelioxys quadriceps
Coelioxys quadridentata
Coelioxys quadrifasciata
Coelioxys quaerens
Coelioxys quartodecimdentata
Coelioxys quattuordecimpunctata
Coelioxys quechua

R
Coelioxys radoszkowskyi
Coelioxys raffrayi
Coelioxys ramakrishnae
Coelioxys recusata
Coelioxys reediana
Coelioxys reginae
Coelioxys remissa
Coelioxys reticulata
Coelioxys rhadia
Coelioxys rhinosa
Coelioxys riojana
Coelioxys robusta
Coelioxys roigi
Coelioxys rosarina
Coelioxys rostrata
Coelioxys rotundiscutum
Coelioxys rubella
Coelioxys rufa
Coelioxys rufescens
Coelioxys ruficincta
Coelioxys ruficollis
Coelioxys rufipes
Coelioxys rufispina
Coelioxys rufitarsis
Coelioxys rufocincta
Coelioxys rufopicta
Coelioxys rugicollis
Coelioxys rugulosa
Coelioxys ruizi
Coelioxys ruzi

S
Coelioxys sakamotorum
Coelioxys salinaria
Coelioxys saltensis
Coelioxys sanguinea
Coelioxys sanguinicollis
Coelioxys sanguinosa
Coelioxys sanjuanina
Coelioxys sannicolarensis
Coelioxys sayi
Coelioxys schmidti
Coelioxys schulzi
Coelioxys scioensis
Coelioxys scitula
Coelioxys scutellaris
Coelioxys scutellotuberculata
Coelioxys semenowi
Coelioxys semicarinata
Coelioxys seminitida
Coelioxys serricaudata
Coelioxys setosa
Coelioxys sexmaculata
Coelioxys siamensis
Coelioxys simillima
Coelioxys slossoni
Coelioxys smithii
Coelioxys sodalis
Coelioxys sogdiana
Coelioxys soledadensis
Coelioxys somalica
Coelioxys somalina
Coelioxys spativentris
Coelioxys spatulata
Coelioxys speculifera
Coelioxys spilaspis
Coelioxys spinipyga
Coelioxys spinosa
Coelioxys spissicauda
Coelioxys squamatula
Coelioxys squamigera
Coelioxys squamosa
Coelioxys squamosissima
Coelioxys squamosoides
Coelioxys squamosula
Coelioxys strigata
Coelioxys subdentata
Coelioxys subelongata
Coelioxys subhamata
Coelioxys subnitens
Coelioxys subspinosa
Coelioxys subtropicalis
Coelioxys sudanensis
Coelioxys surinamensis

T
Coelioxys tabayensis
Coelioxys tarda
Coelioxys tastil
Coelioxys tegularis
Coelioxys tehuelche
Coelioxys tenacior
Coelioxys tenax
Coelioxys tenebrosa
Coelioxys tenebrosoides
Coelioxys tepaneca
Coelioxys texana
Coelioxys tiburonensis
Coelioxys tilcarae
Coelioxys togoensis
Coelioxys tolteca
Coelioxys toltecoides
Coelioxys torquata
Coelioxys torrida
Coelioxys torridula
Coelioxys totonaca
Coelioxys trancas
Coelioxys triangula
Coelioxys tricarinata
Coelioxys tridentata
Coelioxys triodonta
Coelioxys trispinosa
Coelioxys truncaticauda
Coelioxys tucumana
Coelioxys turbinata

U
Coelioxys ultima
Coelioxys umbripennis
Coelioxys unicula
Coelioxys unidentata

V
Coelioxys variegata
Coelioxys verticalis
Coelioxys victoriae
Coelioxys vigilans
Coelioxys vituperabilis

W
Coelioxys wagenknechti
Coelioxys warnckei
Coelioxys weinlandi
Coelioxys weyrauchi
Coelioxys wilmattae

X
Coelioxys xinjiangensis

Y
Coelioxys yanonis
Coelioxys yunnanensis

Z
Coelioxys zapoteca
Coelioxys zonula

References

•
Coelioxys